The Woods Lake Resort, in Eagle County, Colorado near Thomasville, Colorado, was listed on the National Register of Historic Places in 1988.

It is a rustic-style resort which was famous for its fishing, in the two lakes and connecting stream in the area.

References

Historic districts on the National Register of Historic Places in Colorado
National Register of Historic Places in Eagle County, Colorado